Pathways of Life (German: Lebensbahnen) is a 1918 German silent film in 5 acts directed by Ernst Sachs. The film tells the story of an opera singer who rises to stardom with tragic consequences.

The film is the first one produced by Max Nivelli. Nivellia and the film received favorable reviews. He also acted in the lead role and sang in various screenings.

The music score was composed by Bertrand Sänger with the theme song Dreams of Happiness (German: Träumen vom Glück).

Cast 

 Max Nivelli
 Paula Barra
 Lina Salten
 Ernst Sachs

References

External links 

 

1918 films
Films of the Weimar Republic
German silent feature films
German black-and-white films
1910s German films